Midlands State University is a government owned university in Zimbabwe. The university has 9 faculties (Agriculture, Arts, Commerce, Education, Engineering, Law, Science, Social Sciences and Medicine) offering a wide variety of courses and many specialist programmes. The university is accredited through the National Council for Higher Education, under the Ministry of Higher and Tertiary Education of Zimbabwe.

The main campus is located in Gweru the third largest city in Zimbabwe. The university adopted a multi campus system therefore it has a satellite campus in the mining town of Zvishavane and other campuses located in the city of Gweru. TelOne campus is the second popular campus after Main campus.

History
The idea of a university in the Midlands Province dates back to the foundation of the National University of Science and Technology when Gweru, which was identified as a possible site for a second university campus in the country, lost its bid to Bulawayo. Two other opportunities to host institutions of higher learning (the Open University and the Catholic University) were also missed by the Midlands Province, when the two universities went to Harare. It was in the midst of such disappointments that two initiatives converged to give birth to what has since become the Midlands State University. The President R G Mugabe, on the nudging of the provincial political leadership of the Midlands, accepted the idea of a national university being built in the Midlands. This coincided with the then Ministry of Higher Education and Technology's policy of devolution, which was aimed at expanding access to higher education by converting teachers and technical colleges into degree granting institutions. It was through the process of devolution that beginning in 1998 Gweru Teachers College started to enrol students studying for the Bachelor of Commerce with Education and the Bachelor of Science with Education degrees offered by the University of Zimbabwe.

In the meantime, although the devolution policy inaugurated an irrevocable process of bringing university education to the Midlands, there was a strong feeling, especially in the Province, that what was being done did not quite amount to the President's promise of a fully fledged state university in the province. Responding to these feelings, but without losing sight of constraints imposed on Government by declining national funds, the Minister of Higher Education and Technology transformed the devolution project at Gweru into Zimbabwe's third state university by means of the State University in the Midlands Act of April 1999.

The new university, whose name was later changed to the Midlands State University, was to be housed at the Gweru Teachers College premises.

Organisation
The titular head of the university is the Chancellor, who is the President of Zimbabwe. The university is governed by a University Council, comprising the university's chief officers, representatives of the Senate, staff and students, nominees of the Minister of Higher and Tertiary Education and representatives form various sectors of commerce and civil society. The chief executive of the university is the Vice-Chancellor, who is appointed by the Chancellor after consultation with the Minister of Higher and Tertiary Education and the University Council. The Vice-Chancellor is assisted by one or more Pro–Vice-Chancellors, appointed by the University Council with the approval of the Minister of Higher and Tertiary Education.

The academic authority of the university is vested in the Senate, comprising the university's chief officers, the deans of faculties, all full professors, the chairmen of departments and staff and student representatives. The university is divided into faculties, managed by an executive dean and governed by a Faculty Board comprising all professors and lecturers.

Academic programmes

The degree programmes and courses on offer are strengthened through flexible packaging of modules. Flexible packaging allows students studying for a particular degree to make themselves more marketable by including in this package of studies more modules from other programmes.

Fully semesterised university
Midlands State University is a fully semestered and modularised University. Enrolment takes place twice a year, in March and in August. Modules offered at any level in a semester are available at the same level during the next semester. This arrangement gives an opportunity to those students who, at the end of a semester are required to 'carry' or 'repeat' failed modules to do so in the next semester.

Students enrolled at MSU study for four-year or five-year degree programmes spending their Third Level on Work Related Learning in industry and other work places. Work Related Learning is an approach to teaching and learning which requires a student to spend some time during the course of study on 'hands on' practical experience.

Student life
Residences
There is a large number of flats which house male and female students separately. Many of the flats are named after prominent anti-colonial patriots such as Kaguvi and Nehanda. In 2013, the university constructed new halls of residence so as to cope with the increasing number of undergraduates. MSU is also currently constructing Halls of residence at its Telone Campus, and these are the most expensive and stylish hostels. The Batanai Campus has two hostels namely Rutendo and Ruzivo.  Below is a table of all hostels and their locations:

These hostels, however cannot accommodate all students and may not be preferred or afforded by all students therefore a lot of students are accommodated in close neighbourhoods that include Senga, KMP, Nehosho, Windsor Park, Daylesford, Kopje and Gweru East.

Ranking
MSU is featured in major international rankings such as the Times Higher Education Supplement, QS World University Rankings or the Academic Ranking of World Universities. It is ranked number one in Zimbabwe as the fastest growing in Zimbabwe and it is ranked number two in Zimbabwe

Campuses
Midlands State University has many campuses and these include

 Main Campus in Gweru
 Telone Campus which accommodates the Business and Law students in Gweru 
 Batanai Campus which accommodates the School of Tourism and Hospitality studies in Gweru 
 Harare Campus in Harare
 Mutare Campus which houses most Engineering programmes in Mutare
 ZVishavane Campus in the mining town of Zvishavane

In 2018, MSU also announced plans of opening another campus in Redcliff Town and back in 2015 news hit the newspapers that MSU had been given land to open a Law School in Kwekwe.

References

External links
 

Midlands State University
Gweru
Educational institutions established in 1993
1993 establishments in Zimbabwe
Buildings and structures in Midlands Province
Education in Midlands Province